Galtara somaliensis is a moth of the subfamily Arctiinae. It was described by George Hampson in 1916. It is found in Ethiopia, Oman, Saudi Arabia, Somalia and Yemen.

References

 

Nyctemerina
Moths described in 1916